Beinn Reithe is a mountain in Argyll in the Scottish Highlands and forms part of the Ardgoil Peninsula and Arrochar Alps. Beinn Reithe is located between Loch Goil and Loch Long; it reaches a height just over 2000 ft. The mountain is most noticeable from the western shores of Loch Goil and it is also within Loch Lomond and the Trossachs National Park.

References

Mountains and hills of Argyll and Bute